Adam Dennison (born 3 May 1997) is an Irish cricketer. He made his Twenty20 cricket debut for Northern Knights in the 2017 Inter-Provincial Trophy on 26 May 2017. Prior to his Twenty20 debut, he was part of Ireland's squad for the 2016 Under-19 Cricket World Cup.

He made his List A debut for Northern Knights in the 2017 Inter-Provincial Cup on 29 May 2017. He made his first-class debut for Northern Knights in the 2017 Inter-Provincial Championship on 30 May 2017.

References

External links
 

1997 births
Living people
Irish cricketers
Northern Knights cricketers
Place of birth missing (living people)